Mohuk Yek (also Romanized as Mohūḵ Yek) is a village in Keshvar Rural District, Papi District, Khorramabad County, Lorestan Province, Iran. At the 2006 census, its population was 20, in 6 families.

References 

Towns and villages in Khorramabad County